RAF Harpur Hill was a Royal Air Force base, situated at Harpur Hill near Buxton, Derbyshire in England. The site was operational from 1938 to 1960 and was mainly used as an underground munitions storage facility. It became the largest ammunitions dump in the country across the  site.

RAF site history 
During World War I, the Frith artillery range was located on the site.

From December 1939 to December 1960, the RAF Maintenance Unit 28 was based at Harpur Hill. The RAF used Harpur Hill as an underground munitions store. In 1938 the Air Ministry bought Harpur Hill Quarry from ICI. 11 tunnels were built (concrete galleries covered by waste quarry stones) and dug into the hillside from 1938 to 1940 by McAlpine (at a cost of £6,500,000) to house munitions (ammunition and weapons) and ordnance (bombs and explosives) during World War II. The small entrance leads into one main tunnel, which used to have a railway track running along its length, with three side tunnels branching off on each side. There are four slightly smaller tunnels on a lower level, accessed by lifts. War food rations were also stored within the tunnel system. Bombs were transported to the site by road and by the mainline railway through the site (a branch of the Cromford and High Peak Railway).

After the end of the war, a bomb disposal unit was based at the site. The RAF UXO (Unexploded Ordnance) unit, known as an X station, was used to store and disarm captured German ordnance, including V-rocket warheads. The RAF disposed of chemical weapons, including mustard gas and phosgene, by burning them with bleach on the surrounding hills. This generated large volumes of toxic fumes, which killed off much of the surrounding vegetation.

The large bomb store built in 1939 at RAF Llanberis in Wales was modelled on the underground tunnel design at RAF Harpur Hill.

The original wartime RAF camp at Harpur Hill was a top secret facility and was heavily defended. The camp's housing for staff was built nearby on roads named after past RAF war heroes (such as Nettleton, Tedder and Trenchard). A new site was constructed lower down the hill after the war. Bombs continued to be stored underground during the 1950s. The RAF base was closed in 1961.

RAF Mountain Rescue Service 
The RAF Mountain Rescue Service branch for the Peak District was set up (and formalised in January 1944) within RAF Maintenance Unit 28 at Harpur Hill. The team was led by the site's medical officer Flight Lieutenant (later Air Commodore) Dr.David Crichton and it recovered many wartime aircrew from crashes. The high moors and hills of the Peak District have accounted for over 250 aircraft crashes. On 3 November 1948 the RAF team was called out to locate the US Air Force (USAF) Boeing RB-29A Superfortress which had crashed near Bleaklow moor on the Kinder Scout moorland plateau. All 13 crew perished in the tragedy and the crashed aircraft became known as the Bleaklow Bomber. Much of the wreckage is still visible at the crash site, where a memorial was erected in 1988.

Later uses  

After the RAF left the tunnels, Somerset-based Wrington Vale Nurseries bought the underground tunnel network in 1964 and used it as a mushroom farm for over 10 years. Rubble from the demolition of Buxton’s Empire Hotel was used to fill in the channel of the railway line in the main tunnel. After the tunnels were closed again, they were sold to a group of local businessmen and used as a cold store for cheese; a warehouse was built for dry and bonded wines and spirits. Several local hauliers provided the transport for these goods. One of the hauliers was Lomas Distribution and Christian Salvesen and was a major employer in the area; it later sold the site to French transport company Norbert Dentressangle.

Derbyshire College for Further Education moved from its 1950s premises in the Peak Buildings on Terrace Road to the former RAF base at Harpur Hill in 1965. It became known as High Peak College and closed on 1 August 1998.

The site today 

Many of the defensive bunkers can still be seen in the surrounding hillside. The site is now operated by the Health and Safety Executive Laboratory, which has had a presence on the site since 1924, when it was the Safety in Mines Research Establishment (SMRE).

See also 

 RAF munitions storage during World War II

References 

Harpur Hill
Harpur Hill
Buildings and structures in Buxton